This is an alphabetical list of female poets who were active in England and Wales, and the Kingdom of Great Britain and Ireland before approximately 1800. Nota bene: Authors of poetry are the focus of this list, though many of these writers worked in more than one genre.

Poets

A

B

C

D

E

F

G

H

I

J

K

L

M

N

O

P

R

S

T

V

W

Y

See also

Notes

Resources 
Blain, Virginia, et al., eds. The Feminist Companion to Literature in English. New Haven and London: Yale UP, 1990. (Internet Archive)
Buck, Claire, ed.The Bloomsbury Guide to Women's Literature. Prentice Hall, 1992. (Internet Archive)
Greer, Germaine, ed. Kissing the Rod: an anthology of seventeenth-century women's verse. Farrar Straus Giroux, 1988.
Lonsdale, Roger ed. Eighteenth Century Women Poets: An Oxford Anthology. New York: Oxford University Press, 1989.
Oxford Dictionary of National Biography. Oxford: OUP, 2004.
Robertson, Fiona, ed. Women's Writing, 1778–1838. Oxford: OUP, 2001. (Internet Archive)
Schlueter, Paul, and June Schlueter. An encyclopedia of British women writers. Rutgers University Press, 1998. (Internet Archive)
Todd, Janet, ed. British Women Writers: a critical reference guide. London: Routledge, 1989. (Internet Archive)

External links 
Bibliography of Early Modern Women Writers That Are In Print
17th Century Women Poets Biographical and bibliographical information on selected poets
British Women Romantic Poets An electronic collection of texts for the period (1789–1832).
The Brown University Women Writers Project Emphasis is on pre-Victorian women writers.
A Celebration of Women Writers  A major focus of this site is the development of on-line editions of older, often rare, out-of-copyright works. 
Emory Women Writers Resource Project A collection of texts by women writing from the seventeenth century through the early twentieth century. 
List of biographical dictionaries Collectively, the resources at this site "provide information about any 17th-century British woman writer one could imagine."
Luminarium  An online Anthology of English Literature
A Time-Line of English Poetry from Old English to Post Modern
Representative Poetry Online Includes an index of 4,079 English poems by 618 poets, with bibliographies and literary criticism.
Romantic Circles, a refereed scholarly website devoted to the study of Romantic-period literature and culture.
Women Romantic-Era Writers
The Women Writers Archive: Early Modern Women Writers Online

 

Lists of poets
Poets
Lists of British women